Stephen Robert Torpey (born 16 September 1981) is an English football coach and former player who now works as a coach in Manchester City's youth teams.

A forward, he played one game in the English Football League for Port Vale in 2001, and also played in the Conference National for Halifax Town between 2006 and 2008. He also played once for Scarborough, and also turned out for lower non-league sides Prescot Cables, Altrincham, Atherton Laburnum Rovers, FC United of Manchester, Stalybridge Celtic, AFC Telford United, and Fleetwood Town. He then went into coaching with Liverpool and Manchester City.

Playing career
A versatile forward, Torpey started out as a Liverpool trainee, spending six years there and representing England at schoolboy level before moving to Second Division Port Vale in 2001. He made his debut for the "Valiants" on 1 September 2001, replacing George O'Callaghan 57 minutes into a 2–0 defeat to Reading at Vale Park. In October he was loaned out to Conference National side Scarborough, and played in one League Trophy game before returning to Burslem.

He moved to Prescot Cables of the North West Counties League in 2002, helping the club to win two promotions in as many years, leaving them in the Northern Premier League Premier Division. In 2004, he joined Altrincham in the Conference North, before moving back to Prescot in February 2005. In March 2005 he signed dual forms enabling him to also play for Atherton Laburnum Rovers. At the end of 2004–05, Cables lost out to Workington at the play-off semi-final stage.

In 2005, he joined the newly formed FC United of Manchester, a club formed by fans in protest to the Glazer ownership of Manchester United. He scored the club's first ever goal, in a friendly match against Flixton in August 2005. After a successful first season, in which the club won promotion out of North West Counties League Division Two, he moved into the Conference in August 2006 with Halifax Town. He played 27 games for Halifax throughout the 2006–07 campaign, scoring seven goals. He played 24 games in 2007–08, scoring two goals, before he left the Shay in February 2008, after being told he was not going to be given a new contract. He joined Conference North side Stalybridge Celtic on loan, and joined the club permanently in the summer. He scored 20 goals in 62 games for the club in all competitions. At the end of the 2008–09 season Torpey signed for Conference North rivals Telford United. After just months at Telford, they agreed to sell him to Fleetwood Town Fleetwood were promoted at the end of 2009–10, after beating Alfreton Town in the play-offs.

In summer 2010 he played for F.C. United of Manchester, now in the Northern Premier League Premier Division, again in pre-season friendlies but was not named in the 21 player squad for the 2010–11 season by the club, as he was still considering offers from various clubs in higher leagues. It was announced on 28 August that he had re-signed for the club. He left the club in October 2011 after repeated injury problems, having had his registration released by manager Karl Marginson.

Coaching career
Torpey worked as a coach with Liverpool's youth teams, working with a range of age groups over a six year period finishing with the role of Head Of Foundation phase and U11 lead coach. He took up a similar position at Manchester City in 2014 (Foundation Phase Co Ordinator / U11 Lead Coach). Since then Torpey has progressed through the Academy system at City, becoming Head of Coaching u9-u12 before taking on the role of Head of Coaching u15-u23 in August 2020 overseeing the clubs first Premier League 2, u18 Premier League North, U18 Premier League National play-off and FA Youth Cup wins in his first season.

Career statistics
Source:

Honours
Prescot Cables
North West Counties Football League: 2002–03
Northern Premier League First Division promotion: 2003–04

F.C. United of Manchester
North West Counties Football League Division Two: 2005–06

References

1981 births
Living people
People from Kirkby
Footballers from Liverpool
English footballers
Association football forwards
Liverpool F.C. players
Port Vale F.C. players
Atherton Laburnum Rovers F.C. players
Prescot Cables F.C. players
Altrincham F.C. players
F.C. United of Manchester players
Halifax Town A.F.C. players
Stalybridge Celtic F.C. players
AFC Telford United players
Fleetwood Town F.C. players
English Football League players
National League (English football) players
Northern Premier League players
Association football coaches
Liverpool F.C. non-playing staff
Manchester City F.C. non-playing staff